Georgi Filipov Bokov (15 January 1920 – 1 June 1989) was a member of the Bulgarian resistance movement during the Second World War. Later, he became a leading member of the Bulgarian Communist Party and editor-in-chief of Rabotnichesko Delo, the official newspaper and organ of the Bulgarian Communist Party

Biography

In 1976, Georgi Bokov was removed from all his positions and retired. He was posthumously expelled from the Bulgarian Journalist Association.

Family 
Georgi Bokov is father of:
 Filip Bokov – Bulgarian politician.
 Irina Bokova – Politician and former Director-General of UNESCO.

1920 births
1989 deaths
Bulgarian resistance members
Bulgarian Communist Party politicians
People from Blagoevgrad Province